David Isaakovich Traktovenko is a Russian businessman and the owner of A-League club Sydney FC.

Business
In 1978 Traktovenko graduated from Voznesensky Financial School with a degree in credit and finance. As a doctor of economics, he worked as an economist and then as a manager of State Bank department. In 1988, he joined the Leningrad office of the USSR Promstroybank (PSB). He soon became commercial director of Promstroybank and later a board member. In 1995, he was appointed board member of Vyborg-Bank and in 1998 was also a board member of St. Petersburg bank. Traktovenko chaired the board of directors of International Bank of St. Petersburg. In 2011 his wealth was estimated at $550 million.

Football
Traktovenko was chairman of the board of directors of FC Zenit from 2003 to 2005.

Traktovenko took over the ownership of A-League club Sydney FC in March 2009.

References

1956 births
Living people
Businesspeople from Saint Petersburg
A-League Men executives
Sydney FC
FC Zenit Saint Petersburg
Businesspeople from Sydney